This is a list of ministries of the Ottoman Empire. Each ministry was headed by a minister, appointed by the head of cabinet, the Grand Vizier. The Grand Vizier would gradually gain equivalent Prime ministerial powers during the Tanzimat, First Constitutional, and Second Constitutional Eras. He was appointed by the Sultan, who had presidential powers.

 Grand Vizier (Prime Minister)
 Ministry of the Cadastre
 
 Ministry of Evkaf
 Ministry of Finance
 Ministry of Foreign Affairs
 Ministry of the Interior
 Ministry of Justice
 
 
 
 Ministry of Supply
 Ministry of Trade and Agriculture
 Ministry of War

See also 

 Ministries of Turkey

References 

Ottoman Empire
Government of the Ottoman Empire
Ottoman Empire-related lists